Doris atypica is a species of sea slug, a dorid nudibranch, a marine gastropod mollusk in the family Dorididae.

Distribution
This species occurs off the Cape Verde Islands.

References

Dorididae
Gastropods described in 1906
Gastropods of Cape Verde